Past // Present // Future is the debut studio album by American pop punk band Meet Me at the Altar. It was released on March 10, 2023.

Background and recording
After signing to the Fueled by Ramen and releasing their debut EP on a major record label, Model Citizen (2021), the band initially planned to release their debut album in 2022. However, by June 2022, despite recording progressing well, the album was pushed back to early 2023. The band worked with music producer John Fields and collaborated with writer and producer John Ryan on the album as well.

Themes and composition
The band described the album and its title as "pay[ing] homage to the music we loved growing up while reflecting our modern-day lives, sounds, and experiences". The band's influences in creating the album include Paramore, Pink, and Fall Out Boy. The albums' first single, and album opener, has been described as a pop punk "diss track" aimed at critics who aren't giving them a chance in the music industry.

Release and promotion
The album's first single, "Say It (To My Face)", was released in September 2022, well in advance of the album. Towards the end of 2022, the song was used in a Taco Bell television ad. The album's release date and name was revealed in January 2023, on an episode of The Late Show With Stephen Colbert, where the band also performed "Say It (To My Face)" live as well. A North American tour to support the album is scheduled across March and April 2023.

Reception

The album was listed on Consequence's most anticipated albums of 2023 list, along with the band being named one of the publication's "15 Rising Artists to Watch in 2023" because of the release.

Track listing

Personnel
 Edith Johnson – vocals
 Tea Campbell – guitar, bass
 Ada Juarez – drums

Release history

References

2023 debut albums
Fueled by Ramen albums